Cruise (Kruiz) is a heavy metal band from the former Soviet Union. Started in 1980 as a government-controlled soft rock and pop act, the band enjoyed great success all across the USSR before the revocation of their license to perform/record in 1984 as part of the state's brief crackdown on the Western culture. In 1985, founding member and guitarist Valery Gaina reformed the band with a completely different lineup that featured him on lead vocals. This was followed by a major shift in the overall sound and image; from pop rock to heavy metal. In 1987, the band officially released their debut album "Kruiz-1" as a metal band, selling one million of legal copies. Outside Russia, they are best known for their video, In Flames, which was played many times in the mid-1980s, on the Canadian metal show, The Power Hour. Having released their debut English language album in 1988, Kruiz toured extensively in Russia, Europe, and North America before breaking up in 1990.

In 1992, all founding members, excluding Gaina, reformed a non-metal version of the band. Gaina, in turn, organized a one-off reunion of the band's metal lineup in 2016, playing a few sold-out shows to commemorate the 30th anniversary of "Kruiz-1", which was self-published in 1986 on audiotapes prior to its formal release a year later.

History 
Kruiz was formed in 1978, originally playing soft and hard rock songs with Russian lyrics. The original lineup consisted of Alexander Monin (vocals), Valery Gaina (guitars), Alexander Kirnitsky (1956–2008) (bass), Sergey Sarychev (keyboards), and Vsevolod Korolyuk (drums). In 1980, they released their first album called The Top, which was really a collection of demos.

In 1981, they released their first official album, Крутится Волчoк (transcription: Krutitsya Volchok, translation: The Top Keeps Turning), featuring  Alexander Kirnitsky on bass, and additional keyboards by Matvey Anitchkin. This was followed by another album Послушай Человек (Poslusshay Chelovek, translation: Listen, Man).

In 1983, the lineup changed to Monin (vocals), Gaina (guitars), Grigory Bezugly (guitars), Oleg Kuzmichov (bass), Vladimir Kapustin (keyboards), and Nikolai Tchunusov (drums). This lineup released the album Путешествие на Воздушном (Puteshestvye na Vozdushnom, translation: Balloon Journey). Shortly after the release of this album, the band, unfortunately, drew the ire of the Communist government and were ordered to disband. The band released one final album P.S. Продолжение Слeдует (P.S. Prodolzhenye Sleduet, translation: P.S. To be Continued) in 1983, before stopping all activities.

In 1985, Valery Gaina decided to reform the band and take a heavier approach to their music. The new lineup consisted of Gaina (guitars and vocals), Alexander Kirnitsky (bass), Vsevolod Korolyuk (drums), with Vadim Malikov (additional vocals). They released an album called КиКоГаВва (translation: KiKoGaVva), named after the first two letters of the band members names.

This lineup was short-lived and Valery Gaina soon recruited another lineup with himself on vocals and guitars, Fyodor Vasilyev (bass), and Sergey Efimov (drums). This particular incarnation of the band had a speed metal sound. They released a demo and an album, Kruiz-1 on Melodia records (a state-owned record company). One song (Rock is Forever) was promptly banned by the authorities and hence, only appears on the demo. Only two years later the song was released on the compilation album "A Place To Meet ... " with other soviet rock bands.

Kruiz became known to the west, when they opened a few shows for the German band Rage. The band redid some of their songs with English lyrics and released the album Kruiz in 1988, for WEA Records (Warner Bros. Records). The song In Flames from this album received a lot of air-play on the Canadian metal show, The Power Hour. It is on the strength of this album and the video that Kruiz became known as a speed metal band, and their past as a soft-rock/hard-rock band was largely unknown in the west.

The band went on a European Tour in 1989 and were featured on a German TV program, "Mosh Special", on 5 February 1989. Kruiz opened for bands such as Metallica and Slayer and were scheduled to release a third album, titled Culture Shock, but their contractual obligations prevented them from doing so. Sergey Efimov flew back to Russia. Gaina and Vasilyev attempted to finish the album using the services of Iain Finlay (then drummer for Running Wild), but could not complete the album. Shortly after this, the band broke up.

Post breakup 
Valery Gaina then formed the band Gain, with Vladimir Bajin (vocals), Alexander Shprot (bass), and Andrei Shatounovsky (session drummer). This band recorded an album in 1990 but it only came out in 1995, with two bonus tracks from the unreleased third Kruiz album Culture Shock. Valery Gaina then moved to Los Angeles, mainly because of the rise of the Russian Mafia. He formed a band called Karma and released an album (Fence) under the Frozen Hound label. This album was described as a cross between the Stone Temple Pilots and Red Hot Chili Peppers, very unlike the music of Kruiz. Gaina also built his own studio and produced music for local bands. Karma nearly signed with Mercury Records, but the deal fell through. Meanwhile, Gaina put out a dance/hip-hop album called Fantasy by V2, which went gold in South Korea.

Bassist Fyodor Vasilyev went on to play for a Russian hard rock band called Black Coffee, where he found success.

Drummer Sergey Efimov also moved to the United States and later played in bands called Wolves and Hippies of Chaos, where he also sang in the band. He also found work as a session musician.

Reunion 
In 1994, the original vocalist of Kruiz, Alexandre Monin, upon the success of V. Gaina, reformed the band, with the lineup consisting of himself, Gregory Bezougly (guitars), Vladimir Kapoustin (keyboards), Oleg Kouzmitchyov (bass), and Nikolai Tschunosov (drums). This lineup returned to their original style of soft and hard rock music and released three albums, Live at Robin Hood Festival in 1994, Всем встать (translation: Stand Up Everyone) in 1996 and Live Collection in 1998. This lineup also opened for Ronnie James Dio on 3 May 1999, at Moscow, Russia at the Olimpiyskey Stadium. This particular lineup still plays gigs to this day, but do not play any metal, and in fact, don't want anything to do with the Metal Kruiz.

In 2002, Valery Gaina regrouped with the 1988 lineup of Vasilyev and Efimov, and also released a demo under the name of Kruiz. The bass and drums were recorded in Moscow and the tapes were mastered by Gaina in Los Angeles. Gaina also announced plans for a full reunion.

On 27 August 2010 Alexandre Monin died at age of 56 of peritonitis.

Soon after Monin's death, the band announced a new lead singer in the name of Dmitry Avramenko from the band "Charisma".

References

External links 
 Unofficial site, devoted to metallic Kruiz of Gaina & Co
 Kruiz – BNR Metal Pages
 Kruiz – Where are they now
 gainamusic.com – Official webpage of Valery Gaina

Speed metal musical groups
Russian heavy metal musical groups
Soviet heavy metal musical groups
Musical groups established in 1980
Musical groups from Moscow
1980 establishments in the Soviet Union